J/70 is a trailerable,  American sailboat class designed by Alan Johnstone and first built in 2012.

Production 
The boat is built for J Boats by three builders, CCF Composites in the United States, J/Composites in Europe and J/Boats Argentina in South America. At least 1451 had been constructed by 2019.

Design
The J/70 is a small racing keelboat, built predominantly of fiberglass. It has a fractional sloop rig, a transom-hung rudder, a retractable bowsprit and a lift keel. It displaces  and carries  of lead ballast.

Events

World Championship

European Championship

See also
List of sailing boat types

References

External links

2010s sailboat type designs
Keelboats
Trailer sailers
Sailing yachts
Sailboat type designs by Alan Johnstone
Sailboat types built by J/Boats